First Lieutenant John Knight Bucklyn  (March 15, 1834 to May 15, 1906) was an American soldier who fought in the American Civil War. Bucklyn received the country's highest award for bravery during combat, the Medal of Honor, for his action during the Battle of Chancellorsville in Virginia on 3 May 1863. He was honored with the award on 13 July 1899.

Biography

Bucklyn was born in Foster Creek, Rhode Island on 15 March 1834 and enlisted into the 1st Rhode Island Light Artillery.

Two months after the events for which he earned the Medal of Honor, Bucklyn served as 1st Lieutenant and commander of his battery and was involved in the Battle of Gettysburg, where he suffered injuries on 2 July 1863. He returned to active service just two months later and was appointed Assistant Aide to the Adjutant-General under Colonel Thompkins'. He again displayed gallantry during a battle at Shenandoah and brevetted to captain on 19 October 1864.

He died on 15 May 1906 and his remains are interred at the Lower Mystic Cemetery in Connecticut.

Medal of Honor citation

See also

List of American Civil War Medal of Honor recipients: A–F

References

1834 births
1906 deaths
People of Rhode Island in the American Civil War
Union Army officers
United States Army Medal of Honor recipients
American Civil War recipients of the Medal of Honor
People from Mystic, Connecticut